Abdul Samad bin Mohamed Said (born 9 April 1935) is a Malaysian novelist and poet. In May 1976, he was named by Malaysia literature communities and many of the country's linguists as the Pejuang Sastera [Literary Exponent] receiving, within the following decade, the 1979 Southeast Asia Write Award and, in 1986, in appreciation of his continuous writings and contributions to the nation's literary heritage, or Kesusasteraan Melayu, the title Sasterawan Negara or National Leaurate.

Education
A native of the Malaccan Kampung village of Belimbing Dalam, near the town of Durian Tunggal, young Abdul Samad completed his primary education during the World War II years of 1940–46 at Singapore's Sekolah Melayu Kota Raja (Kota Raja Malay School). During the wartime occupation of Malaya and Singapore by the Japanese Empire, he attended the occupying authorities' Sekolah Jepun school for a brief three-month period. Upon the war's conclusion, he furthered his studies at Singapore's Victoria School, graduating in 1956 with Senior Cambridge Certificate. Although starting as a clerk in a hospital, he was soon able to achieve his ambition of becoming a full-time writer in Utusan Melayu, Warta Tebrau and Berita Harian, authoring numerous poems and short stories in the years to come.

Achievements
 Pejuang Sastera (1976)
 SEA Write Award (1979)
 Sasterawan Negara (1985)
 Sasterawan Nusantara (1999)

His poem, "The Dead Crow" was translated into English language and was included in the Malaysian lower secondary school English literature curriculum from 2000 to 2009. A survey was done among 360 students and it was found that 10 (2.8%) of the students described the poem as "hardest to understand" of all the poems taught in secondary school.

Works
A.Samad Said wrote in almost all field of literature and creative writing. Two of his notable works are Salina, about a prostitute in Malay pre Independence and Hujan Pagi (translated to English as Morning Post), considered as Malaysia's first magical realism novel. He wrote novel, short stories, poem, essay, drama and article. Among his anthologies are Suara Dari Dinding Dewan (2003) and Dirgahayu Dr. Mahathir & Rindu Ibu (2004).  His most recent anthology of essays is Ilham Di Tepi Tasik (2006). A. Samad Said is also known as Hilmy, Isa Dahmuri, Jamil Kelana, Manja, Mesra and Shamsir.

 Salina. Kuala Lumpur: Dewan Bahasa dan Pustaka, 1961.  / Revised edition, 1976. . This version uses the New Rumi Spelling. / Second edition, 1989. ; .
 Shōfu Salina (娼婦サリナ). Translated by Tatsuo Hoshino. Tokyo : Imura bunka zigyousya, 1983. . Japanese version of Salina.
 Sallinauiyeonindeul (살리나의연인들). Translated by Jong Yeong-nim. Seoul: Chihaksa, 1987. . Korean version of Salina. 
 Salina. Translated by Hawa Abdullah. Kuala Lumpur: Dewan Bahasa dan Pustaka, Ministry of Education Malaysia, 1991. . / Translated by Lalita Sinha. Kuala Lumpur: Institut Terjemahan & Buku Malaysia, Attin Press, 2013. ; . English versions of Salina.
 Shā lì nà (莎丽娜). Translated by Yu Yu. Taiyuan: Beiyue Literature and Art Publishing House, 1992. ; . Chinese version of Salina.
 Salina. Translated by Laurent Metzger. Paris: L'Harmattan, 1997. ; . French version of Salina.
 Salina. Translated by Rosa Maria Glavan Martinez. Kuala Lumpur: Institut Terjemahan & Buku Malaysia, 2014. ; . Spanish version of Salina.
 Bulan Tak Bermadu di Fatehpur Sikri. Malacca: Toko Buku Abbas Bandong, 1966. . This version uses Za'aba Spelling and released as Bulan Ta' Bermadu di-Fatehpur Sikri / Revised edition, Subang Jaya, Selangor: Tra-Tra, 1982. .
 Sungai Mengalir Lesu. Kuala Lumpur: Pustaka Gunong Tahan, 1967. . / Kuala Lumpur: Dewan Bahasa dan Pustaka, 1988. ; . This version is written in Jawi script.
 Lazy river Translated by Harry Aveling. Kuala Lumpur: Heinemann Asia, 1981. . English version of Sungai Mengalir Lesu.
 Yōuyōu héshuǐ (悠悠河水). Translated by Lee Ngeok Lan. Kuala Lumpur: Institut Terjemahan & Buku Malaysia, 2014. ; . Chinese version of Sungai Mengalir Lesu.
 Benih Harapan. Kuala Lumpur: Grafika Sendirian Berhad, 1973. . A poem collection.
 Di Hadapan Pulau. Kuala Lumpur: Dewan Bahasa dan Pustaka, 1978. ; .
 Langit Petang. Kuala Lumpur: Dewan Bahasa dan Pustaka, 1980. .
 Daerah Zeni. Petaling Jaya: Fajar Bakti, 1985. ; .
 Benih Semalu
 Daun Semalu Pucuk Paku
 Warkah Eropah
 Al-Amin
 Suara Dari Dinding Dewan
 Hujan Pagi
 Lantai T Pinkie
 Wira Bukit
 Adik Datang
 Cinta Fansuri

Activism and political views

In 2009, A. Samad Said together with four other literary scholars, campaigned to abolish PPSMI (Teaching of Mathematics and Science in English) in Malaysian secondary schools. He believed that such opposition is needed to prevent the degradation of Malay language usage in Malaysia. He also participated in an anti-PPSMI rally near the Malaysia Royal Palace in order to hand over a memorandum to the palace.

He became the co-chairperson for Bersih 2.0 rally together with Ambiga Sreenevasan in 2011 in order to support a free and fair elections in Malaysia. He also composed a poem named "Unggun Bersih" (Cleansing fire) where the poem became a subject of police investigation for sedition. Disappointed with the lack of electoral reform, he openly supported for Bersih 3.0 rally in the following year. During this rally, he composed another two poems which expressed his disappointment when he was not allowed to go to National Mosque of Malaysia to conduct his prayers and describing a clash between the Bersih 3.0 supporters and authorities guarding the Merdeka Square, Kuala Lumpur. During the 2013 Malaysian general elections, he openly supported Pakatan Rakyat (PR) coalition in order to end the Barisan Nasional (BN) rule in Malaysia, believing that PR can deliver on fixing the problems in Malaysian healthcare, education, and democracy systems. He also criticised BN for using racist, vote-buying, and scare-tactics during the election. In Samad Said's opinion, Chin Peng was not a communist terrorist as depicted by Malaysian government but should be regarded as a freedom fighter and be allowed back to Malaysia from exile in Thailand. This is because Chin Peng had fought against the Japanese and British colonial masters before the independence of Malaya. On 13 June 2015, Samad Said joined Democratic Action Party (DAP). He described the party as a "truly Malaysian party, which is clean, focused, with a genuine Malaysian dream".

Honours

Honours of Malaysia
  :
  Commander of the Order of the Defender of State (DGPN) - Dato' Seri (2017)
  :
  Darjah Mulia Seri Melaka (DMSM) - Datuk (1996)

References

External links
 A. Samad Said on eSastera

Living people
1935 births
People from Malacca
Malaysian people of Malay descent
Malaysian Muslims
Malaysian writers
Malaysian novelists
Malaysian poets
Malay-language poets
Malaysian National Laureates
S.E.A. Write Award winners
Democratic Action Party (Malaysia) politicians
Victoria School, Singapore alumni